Américo Ferreira dos Santos Silva (16 January 1830 – 21 January 1899) was a Portuguese prelate of the Catholic Church, who was Bishop of Porto from 1871 until his death. He was made a cardinal in 1879.

Biography
Américo Ferreira dos Santos Silva was born in Porto on 16 January 1830. His father Joao Ferreira dos Santos Silva, baron of Santos, was a businessman and banker; his mother Carolina Augusta de La Rocque was of French descend. The family lived in Paris for a time and from 1840 to 1843 he studied at a Portuguese-language school, Colegio Luso-Brasileiro in Fontenay-aux-Roses outside of Paris.

He studied at the Theological Faculty of Coimbra and earned a doctorate in theology in 1852. He was ordained a priest of the Diocese of Porto on 26 September 1852. From 1853 to 1862, he taught dogmatic and pastoral theology at the seminary in Santarém, where he became vice-rector in 1855. In the 1860s he moved to Lisbon and held several positions before bring named archpriest on 13 August 1869 and serving as vicar from 1869 to 1871. 

King Luís I of Portugal nominated him for bishop of Porto on 31 May 1871 and Pope Pius IX appointed him bishop of Porto on 26 June 1871. He received his episcopal consecration on 10 September 1871 from Inácio do Nascimento de Morais Cardoso, patriarch of Lisbon. He distinguished himself in promoting the education of the clergy and their proper behavior.

Pope Leo XIII made him a cardinal priest on 12 May 1879. He received his red galero and the title of Santi Quattro Coronati on 27 February 1880.

A guide to the College of Cardinals published in 1889 said he was a rare example of virtue and austerity among the Portuguese hierarchy, well-known in Portugal but "perfectly unknown" in Rome, sufficiently unknown to be misidentified as an archbishop.

He died in Porto on 21 January 1899.

Notes

References

External links
 
 

1830 births
1899 deaths
People from Porto
Bishops of Porto
Cardinals created by Pope Leo XIII
19th-century Portuguese cardinals